Carcina luridella is a moth in the family Depressariidae. It was described by Hugo Theodor Christoph in 1882. It is found in the Russian Far East (Amur, Ussuri, Sakhalin, Kunashir) and Japan.

References

Moths described in 1882
Peleopodinae